Arya Bharati High School is a high school in Omallur, Pathanamthitta, Kerala, India. The school is operated by the Syro-Malankara Catholic Church.  Both the English language and the Malayalam language are used in instruction.

References

External links
 Syro-Malankara Catholic Church

Syro-Malankara Catholic Church
Education in Pathanamthitta